The 1924 Kansas Jayhawks football team represented the University of Kansas in the Missouri Valley Conference during the 1924 college football season. In their fourth season under head coach Potsy Clark, the Jayhawks compiled a 2–5–1 record (2–4–1 against conference opponents), finished in seventh place in the conference, and were outscored by opponents by a combined total of 68 to 30. They played their home games at Memorial Stadium in Lawrence, Kansas. Harold Burt was the team captain.

Schedule

References

Kansas
Kansas Jayhawks football seasons
Kansas Jayhawks football